The year 2022 is the 10th year in the history of the Absolute Championship Akhmat, a mixed martial arts promotion based in Russia. 2022 will begin with ACA 135.

List of events

2022 ACA Lightweight Grand Prix
The prize fund of the Grand Prix in a lightweight division will be 800.000 dollars, this was announced by the founder of the ACA league Mairbek Khasiev, with the winner of the GP getting a cash prize of $200,000.

Participants: Alain Ilunga, Ali Bagov, Yusuf Raisov, Hacran Dias, Artem Reznikov,  Eduard Vartanyan, Davi Ramos
Rashid Magomedov and Ali Bagov fought at ACA 141. However the bout ended in a no contest due to the president of ACA stopping the bout due to inactivity. Both were eliminated from the tournament.

ACA 135: Gasanov vs. Dzhanaev

Absolute Championship Akhmat 135: Gasanov vs. Dzhanaev was a mixed martial arts event held by Absolute Championship Akhmat on January 28, 2022 at the Sports Hall Coliseum in Grozny, Russia.

Background
The event featured a title fight  for the ACA Middleweight Championship  between the champion Magomedrasul Gasanov and #3 ranked Abdul-Rahman Dzhanaev as the event headliner.

A match for the vacant ACA Flyweight Championship between #2 ranked Murad Zeynulabidov and #4 ranked Imran Bukuev was planned as the event co-headliner. However, has Zeynulabidov to withdraw from the fight due to an injury suffered during his training camp. the bout was canceled.

Bonus awards:

The following fighters were awarded bonuses:
$50,000 Performance of the Night: Magomedrasul Gasanov
$25,000 Performance of the Night: Abdul-Rakhman Dzhanaev
$5000 Stoppage Victory Bonuses: Tomáš Deák, Shamil Shakhbulatov

Results

ACA 136: Bukuev vs Akopyan

Absolute Championship Akhmat 136: Bukuev vs Akopyan was a mixed martial arts event held by Absolute Championship Akhmat on February 26, 2022, in Moscow, Russia.

Background
The main event was set to feature a welterweight title fight, the reigning ACA Welterweight Champion Abubakar Vagaev was set to defend his title against Ustarmagomed Gadzhidaudov. However, Vagaev has to withdraw on January 26 due to COVID-19. The bout between Imran Bukuev and Aren Akopyan was prompted to the main event of the evening, the fight was for the vacant ACA Flyweight championship. The belt was vacated when Azamat Kerefov officially announced on October 3, 2021, that he voluntarily vacated the title to try free agency.

A welterweight bout between Vitaliy Slipenko and Stefan Sekulić was scheduled as the co-main event. Sekulić stepped in as a replacement for Mark Hulme, who withdrew from the bout.

Bonus awards:

The following fighters were awarded bonuses:
$50,000 Performance of the Night:
$5000 Stoppage Victory Bonuses:

Results

ACA 137: Magomedov vs. Matevosyan

Absolute Championship Akhmat 137: Magomedov vs. Matevosyan will be a mixed martial arts event held by Absolute Championship Akhmat on March 6, 2022, at the Basket-Hall Krasnodar in Krasnodar, Russia.

Background
A ACA Heavyweight Championship bout between the reigning champion Tony Johnson Jr. and title challenger Salimgerey Rasulov was booked as the event headliner. However, After being unable to obtain a visa in time, Johnson was forced to pull out of the bout.

Bonus awards:

The following fighters were awarded bonuses:
$50,000 Performance of the Night:
$5000 Stoppage Victory Bonuses:

Fight Card

ACA 138: Vagaev vs Gadzhidaudov

Absolute Championship Akhmat 138: Vagaev vs Gadzhidaudov will be a mixed martial arts event held by Absolute Championship Akhmat on March 26, 2022, at the Sports Hall Coliseum in Grozny, Russia.

Background

Bonus awards:

The following fighters were awarded bonuses:
$50,000 Performance of the Night:
$5000 Stoppage Victory Bonuses:

Fight Card

ACA 139: Vartanyan vs. Ilunga

Absolute Championship Akhmat 139: Vartanyan vs. Ilunga was a mixed martial arts event held by Absolute Championship Akhmat on May 21, 2022 at the CSKA Arena in Moscow, Russia.

Background
The event was set to feature a quarter-finals bout for the ACA Lightweight Grand Prix between Eduard Vartanyan and Luis Peña. However, Peña could not make it into Russia due to the Russian invasion of Ukraine was replaced by Alain Ilunga.
Bonus awards:

The following fighters were awarded bonuses:
$50,000 Performance of the Night:
$5000 Stoppage Victory Bonuses:

Results

ACA 140: Ramos vs. Reznikov

Absolute Championship Akhmat 140: Ramos vs. Reznikov will be a mixed martial arts event held by Absolute Championship Akhmat on June 17, 2022 at the WOW Arena in Sochi, Russia.

Background

Bonus awards:

The following fighters were awarded bonuses:
$50,000 Performance of the Night:
$5000 Stoppage Victory Bonuses:

Rusults

ACA 141: Froes vs. Suleymanov

Absolute Championship Akhmat 141: Froes vs. Suleymanov will be a mixed martial arts event held by Absolute Championship Akhmat on July 22, 2022 at the Bolshoy Ice Dome in Sochi, Russia.

Background

Bonus awards:

The following fighters were awarded bonuses:
$50,000 Performance of the Night:
$5000 Stoppage Victory Bonuses:

Fight Card

ACA 142: Gadzhidaudov vs Amagov

Absolute Championship Akhmat 142: Gadzhidaudov vs Amagov will be a mixed martial arts event held by Absolute Championship Akhmat on August 13, 2022 at the TatNeft Arena in Kazan, Russia.

Background

Bonus awards:

The following fighters were awarded bonuses:
$50,000 Performance of the Night:
$5000 Stoppage Victory Bonuses:

Fight Card

ACA 143: Gasanov vs Frolov

Absolute Championship Akhmat 143: Gasanov vs Frolov will be a mixed martial arts event held by Absolute Championship Akhmat on August 27, 2022 at the Basket-Hall Krasnodar in Krasnodar, Russia.

Background

Bonus awards:

The following fighters were awarded bonuses:
$50,000 Performance of the Night:
$5000 Stoppage Victory Bonuses:

Fight Card

ACA 144: Nemchinov vs Dipchikov

Absolute Championship Akhmat 144: Nemchinov vs Dipchikov will be a mixed martial arts event held by Absolute Championship Akhmat on September 9, 2022 at the Falcon Club Arena in Minsk, Belarus.

Background

Bonus awards:

The following fighters were awarded bonuses:
$50,000 Performance of the Night:
$5000 Stoppage Victory Bonuses:

Fight Card

ACA 145: Abdulaev vs. Slipenko

Absolute Championship Akhmat 145: Abdulaev vs. Slipenko will be a mixed martial arts event held by Absolute Championship Akhmat on September 23, 2022 at the Sibur Arena in Saint Petersburg, Russia.

Background

Bonus awards:

The following fighters were awarded bonuses:
$50,000 Performance of the Night:
$5000 Stoppage Victory Bonuses:

Fight Card

ACA 146: Abdurahmanov vs. Pessoa

Absolute Championship Akhmat 146: Abdurahmanov vs. Pessoa will be a mixed martial arts event held by Absolute Championship Akhmat on October 4, 2022 at the in Grozny, Russia.

Background

Bonus awards:

The following fighters were awarded bonuses:
$50,000 Performance of the Night:
$5000 Stoppage Victory Bonuses:

Fight Card

ACA 147: Vartanyan vs Raisov

Absolute Championship Akhmat 147: Vartanyan vs Raisov will be a mixed martial arts event held by Absolute Championship Akhmat on November 4, 2022 at the CSKA Arena in Moscow, Russia.

Background

Bonus awards:

The following fighters were awarded bonuses:
$50,000 Performance of the Night:
$5000 Stoppage Victory Bonuses:

Fight Card

ACA 148: Magomedov vs Olenichev

Background

Bonus awards:

The following fighters were awarded bonuses:
$50,000 Performance of the Night:
$5000 Stoppage Victory Bonuses:

Fight Card

ACA 149: Vagaev vs Slipenko

Absolute Championship Akhmat 149: Vagaev vs Slipenko will be a mixed martial arts event held by Absolute Championship Akhmat on December 16, 2022 at the Basket Hall in Moscow, Russia.

Background

Bonus awards:

The following fighters were awarded bonuses:
$50,000 Performance of the Night:
$5000 Stoppage Victory Bonuses:

Fight Card

ACA 150: Koshkin vs. Reznikov

Absolute Championship Akhmat 150: Koshkin vs. Reznikov will be a mixed martial arts event held by Absolute Championship Akhmat on December 23, 2022 at the CSKA Arena in Moscow, Russia.

Background

Bonus awards:

The following fighters were awarded bonuses:
$50,000 Performance of the Night:
$5000 Stoppage Victory Bonuses:

Fight Card

See also
List of current ACA fighters
 2022 in UFC
 2022 in Bellator MMA
 2022 in ONE Championship
 2022 in Konfrontacja Sztuk Walki
 2022 in Rizin Fighting Federation
 2022 in AMC Fight Nights 
 2022 in Brave Combat Federation
 2022 in Road FC
 2022 Professional Fighters League season
 2022 in Eagle Fighting Championship
 2022 in Legacy Fighting Alliance

References

External links
ACA

Absolute Championship Akhmat
Absolute Championship Berkut events
2022 in mixed martial arts